The 2022 T1 League Finals was the championship series of the T1 League's 2021–22 season and conclusion of the season's playoffs. The best-of-seven final series was played by the winners of the semifinals series. Due to the COVID-19 pandemic in Taiwan, the finals series changed to best-of-five series. The finals series started on May 31 and ended on June 4. The series was matched by Kaohsiung Aquas and Taichung Wagor Suns. On June 4, the Kaohsiung Aquas defeated the Taichung Wagor Suns, 3–0, winning the 2021–22 season championship.

Bracket 

Bold Series winner
Italic Team with home-court advantage

Background

Kaohsiung Aquas

Taichung Wagor Suns

Road to the Finals

Regular season series 
The Aquas won 4–2 in the regular-season series.

Series summary

Game summaries

Game 1

Game 2

Game 3

Rosters

Kaohsiung Aquas

Taichung Wagor Suns

Player statistics

Kaohsiung Aquas

Taichung Wagor Suns 

 Reference：

References

External links 

T1 League Finals
F
Basketball events curtailed due to the COVID-19 pandemic
2022 in Taiwanese sport
T1 League
T1 League
Sport in Kaohsiung
Sport in Taichung